Warren House and Warren's Store is a historic house and store and national historic district located at Prospect Hill, Caswell County, North Carolina.  The house was built about 1858, and is a two-story, three bay, Greek Revival style frame dwelling.  It is set on a brick foundation and has a low hipped roof.  The front facade features a two-story, three bay, pedimented porch.  Warren's Store and Post Office is located across from the house and is a two-story rectangular brick building of vernacular Greek Revival temple-form design.  Also on the property is the contributing kitchen building.

It was added to the National Register of Historic Places in 1973.

References

Houses on the National Register of Historic Places in North Carolina
Commercial buildings on the National Register of Historic Places in North Carolina
Greek Revival houses in North Carolina
Houses completed in 1858
Houses in Caswell County, North Carolina
National Register of Historic Places in Caswell County, North Carolina
Historic districts on the National Register of Historic Places in North Carolina